The Shah Alam Komuter station is a Komuter train station located in Seksyen 19, Shah Alam, Selangor, Malaysia. It is served by the KTM Komuter's Port Klang Line.

The Shah Alam Komuter station was built to cater traffic in a popular suburban area with the similar name called Shah Alam and Klang. The Batu Tiga Komuter station, which also serves the same locality is located 1 km away. The station is usually packed during rush hours and public holidays. There are buses and taxis service was easily found at the station to carry passengers to the city center . There is also a free bus service provided by the state government through this station.

Name
The station was formerly a freight station named Sungai Rengam Station in the 1980s.

Platform layout at Shah Alam Komuter station

See also
 Rail transport in Malaysia

References

External links
Kuala Lumpur MRT & KTM Komuter Integrations

Railway stations in Selangor
Port Klang Line
Shah Alam